Irmashevo (İrmäş) is a rural locality (a village) in Yunnovsky Selsoviet, Ilishevsky District, Bashkortostan, Russia. The population was 10 as of 2010. There is one main street.

Geography 
Irmashevo is located 14 km southeast of Verkhneyarkeyevo (the district's administrative centre) by road. Kayenlyk is the nearest rural locality.

References 

Rural localities in Ilishevsky District